The Great Circus Mystery is a 1925 American adventure film serial directed by Jay Marchant.

Cast

Chapter titles

 Pact of Peril
 A Cry for Help
 A Race with Death
 The Plunge of Peril
 The Ladder of Life
 A Leap for Liberty
 Harvest of Hate
 Fires of Fate
 Cycle of Fear
 The Leopard Queen
 The Sacred Ruby
 Dive of Destiny
 A Leap for Liberty
 Buried Treasure
 The Leopard Strikes

See also
 List of film serials
 List of film serials by studio
 List of lost films

References

External links

1925 films
1925 adventure films
1925 lost films
American silent serial films
American black-and-white films
American adventure films
Films directed by Jay Marchant
Lost American films
Circus films
Universal Pictures film serials
1920s American films
Silent adventure films